Ludzas Zeme is a regional newspaper published in Latvia.

External links 

Official website

Ludza
Newspapers published in Latvia